The Smt Eswaramma High School was inspired and initiated by Bhagawan Sri Sathya Sai Baba. In fond memory of His mother, Bhagawan Sri Sathya Sai Baba had inaugurated the Smt. Eswaramma High School on 20 July 1972.

"Character Development with Academic Excellence" has been the governing principle of all endeavours in the school. The school at every step, big or small, is guided by the comprehensive educational philosophy of Bhagawan Baba who emphatically advocates "Education should be for life; not for mere living"

This non residential school is an English Medium school for boys and girls affiliated to the Central Board of Secondary Education, New Delhi [CBSE]. The syllabi and textbooks followed at the school are those prescribed and recommended by the Central Board of Secondary Education, New Delhi.

The school is located inside the 'Sri Sathya Sai Vidya Giri' complex of Prasanthi Nilayam and is housed between the Senior boys hostel and Junior boys hostel, behind the Sri Sathya Sai Hill view stadium.
 
The school provides quality education free of cost. Students go to Sai Kulwant Hall which is inside the Ashram in Puttaparthi, to attend the bhajans on Wednesday and Saturday.

References

High schools and secondary schools in Andhra Pradesh
Schools in Anantapur district
Educational institutions established in 1972
1972 establishments in Andhra Pradesh
Schools affiliated with the Sathya Sai Organization